BC Card (Hangul: 비씨카드) is a South Korean financial services company headquartered in Seoul. South Korea's largest payment processing company, it provides end-to-end payment services, primarily to financial institutions, as well as to local merchants through its subsidiary company Smartro; credit cards, debit cards and prepaid cards; local brand network operation under the brand of "BC"; card issuing BPO (Business Process Outsourcing) to financial institutions; as well as Internet commerce and mobile payment solutions.

Global Payment Services 
BC Card is a leading company in the Korean card industry and is growing into a global payment company, aiming to become a global payment provider. In 2008, when it established a local subsidiary in China, it launched a partnership with China Union, a Chinese credit card company, and launched the "China Series Card." Currently, BC Card is in charge of buying tickets (inbound) of foreign-issued Union Card in South Korea, so if you use a Union Card issued in China, the buyer will be stamped with BC Card on the receipt.

Member companies
Busan Bank
Citibank Korea
Daegu Bank
KEB Hana Card
Industrial Bank of Korea
KB Kookmin Card
Kyongnam Bank
Kwangju Bank
Jeju Bank
Nonghyup
Suhyup
Shinhan Card
Standard Chartered Korea
Woori Card
Korea Development Bank (not member, but issuer)
K Bank (not member, but issuer)
Korea Credit Union (not member, but issuer)
Korea Federation of Community Credit Cooperatives (not member, but issuer)
Korea Post (not member, but issuer)
National Forestry Cooperative Federation (not member, but issuer)
Korean Federation of Savings Banks (not member, but issuer)

Brand
BC Cards are branded credit cards and check cards (aka debit cards).
BC South Korean domestic card
BC Global (treated as Diners Club/Discover outside Korea, credit card (all issuers), check card (Issued by Wooricard, SC Bank only))
BC Visa
BC Master/Maestro
BC JCB (Credit card only)
BC CUP
BC AMEX(Credit card only)

References

External links 
 

Credit cards
Financial services companies established in 1982
Financial services companies of South Korea
1982 establishments in South Korea